The 1934–35 season was the 62nd season of competitive football in Scotland and the 45th season of the Scottish Football League.

Scottish League Division One 

Champions: Rangers
Relegated: St Mirren, Falkirk

Scottish League Division Two 

Promoted: Third Lanark, Arbroath

Scottish Cup 

Division One champions Rangers were winners of the Scottish Cup final after a 2–1 final win over Hamilton Academical.

Other Honours

National

County 

 * - aggregate over two legs
 # - replay

Highland League

Junior Cup 
Tranent were winners of the Junior Cup after a 6–1 win over Petershill in the final.

Scotland national team 

Key:
 (H) = Home match
 (A) = Away match
 BHC = British Home Championship

Notes and references

External links 
 Scottish Football Historical Archive

 
Seasons in Scottish football